Several ships have been named Cora:

 was launched in 1812 and came to England from New Providence. She sailed to Britain and between 1813 and 1820 she was a West Indiaman. Then in 1820 she sailed to the New South Shetland Islands to engage in seal hunting. She was wrecked there in 1821.
 was a schooner launched at Baltimore in 1812. The Royal Navy captured her in February 1813.

Notes
The two vessels above may be the same vessel. It will require original research to settle the question.

See also
 Cora-cora

Ship names